Raghogarh railway station is a railway station on Indore–Gwalior line under the Bhopal railway division of West Central Railway zone. This is situated at Raghogarh-Vijaypur in Guna district of the Indian state of Madhya Pradesh.

References

Railway stations in Guna district
Bhopal railway division